117P/Helin–Roman–Alu, also known as Helin-Roman-Alu 1, is a periodic comet in the Solar System. It is a Quasi-Hilda comet.

References

External links 
 Orbital simulation from JPL (Java) / Horizons Ephemeris
 117P/Helin-Roman-Alu 1 – Seiichi Yoshida @ aerith.net
 Elements and Ephemeris for 117P/Helin-Roman-Alu – Minor Planet Center
 117P at Kronk's Cometography
 Images of 117P by Roger Groom

Periodic comets
0117
117P
117P
Comets in 2014
19891002